Jerry J. Shoener (born December 19, 1927) was an American politician in the state of South Dakota. He was a member of the South Dakota State Senate. Shoener served in the United States Navy in World War II and  later worked for the Rapid City Journal, eventually rising to the position as vice president and circulation director of the newspaper. He was also a member of the South Dakota Transportation Commission and Rapid City Civic Center Board.

In 2013, he was inducted into the South Dakota Hall of Fame.

References

Living people
South Dakota Republicans
1927 births
People from Eagle Butte, South Dakota
Politicians from Rapid City, South Dakota